Hayley Rutherford is a road cyclist from Australia. She represented her nation at the 2000, 2001, 2002 and 2004 UCI Road World Championships.

References

External links
 profile at Procyclingstats.com

Australian female cyclists
Living people
Place of birth missing (living people)
Year of birth missing (living people)